The Iranian railway equipment industry started its activity with wagon production.

It was formed by the inauguration of train-manufacturing company Wagon Pars in 1974. The railway is being developed with Iranian-government backing and forms a part of the Iranian Economic Reform Plan.

The Iran Khodro Rail Transport Industries Company (IRICO) was established in 2003 to produce passenger cars, and the Mapna Locomotive Engineering and Manufacturing Company was established in 2006 to manufacture locomotives.

In July 2012, a Mapna Locomotive Engineering and Manufacturing Company production plant was officially inaugurated. The plant is projected to manufacture 120 locomotives with a maximum speed of  each year.

Iranian rail companies

 Arvin Tabriz Company  established in 1993, TSI certified Y25 bogie manufacturer; Freight wagons leasing service provider.
 Esfahan Steel Company (also known as Zob Ahan) established 1994; rail production; U33
 Iran Heavy Diesel Manufacturing Company (also known as DESA) established in 1991, manufactures diesel-engines
 Iran Khodro Rail Transport Industries Company established 2003; manufactures passenger rolling stock
 Iranian Railroad Industries Development Company switches
 Jala Pardazan Alvand designs and manufactures industrial parts in the railway and automotive industries
 Maharan signaling
 Taam Locomotive Arya
 Mapna Locomotive Engineering and Manufacturing Company established 2006; manufactures locomotives
 Polour Sabz passenger wagons
 Tehran Wagon Manufacturing Company Wagon Sazi Tehran
 Wagon Pars established 1974; manufactures Freight trains, Passenger trains, diesel multiple units and locomotives

See also

 Industry of Iran
 Islamic Republic of Iran Railways

References

Rail industry of Iran